Asher Messing is a former Israeli footballer and manager.

References

1947 births
Living people
Israeli Jews
Israeli footballers
Hapoel Petah Tikva F.C. players
Maccabi Netanya F.C. managers
Hapoel Ramat Gan F.C. managers
Association football midfielders
Israeli football managers